The M92 is a carbine developed and manufactured by Zastava Arms since 1992. It is nearly identical to the Zastava M85 carbine; the only differences between the two are caliber and, correspondingly, magazine design. The M92 is a shortened version of the Zastava M70 assault rifle, which is a modified copy of the Soviet AKM assault rifle.

Overview
The Zastava M92 chambers and fires the Soviet 7.62×39mm round. It is a gas-operated, air-cooled, magazine-fed, and selective fire firearm with an under folding metal stock. In general design, it is a modified hybrid of the Soviet AKMSU and AKS-74U carbines, but is easily distinguished by the design of pistol grip and especially by the longer handguard, which is made out of a different wood type and has three cooling vents instead of the usual two. This feature gives the M92 less overheating on full auto mode.

The M92 also features a shorter barrel. Unlike most rifle rounds which would otherwise experience a loss of velocity out of a shorter barrel, the 7.62×39mm round loses very little velocity when compared to a full length barrel. This makes it an excellent round for short-barrel rifles. The short barrel of the M92 may not lose enough velocity to even make a considerable difference when compared to the M70.

Design and features
The M92 is a gas-operated, air-cooled, magazine-fed, selective fire, shoulder-fired weapon with an underfolding stock. In contrast to the M70, the M92 also features a flash eliminator on the barrel end, which reduces muzzle flash and allows the user to see the bullet's point of impact. Like all carbine rifles, the M92 has a shorter effective range and lower penetration when compared to the original rifle, but it also has its own advantages, it is more efficient in close combat, the handling is improved and it has a higher rate of fire. Other advantages of a shorter barrel also gives it more portability and ease of concealment, making it popular for vehicle crews, pilots and special forces.

Users

: 80,000 bought in 2008-2009

: Used by the Army of North Macedonia.
 : Used by Palestinian presidential guard.
: Used by Special Forces (formerly also used by the Special Operations Unit)

See also

Zastava PAP series

References

External links
Zastava Arms

Zastava Arms
7.62×39mm assault rifles
Rifles of Serbia
Carbines
Military equipment introduced in the 1990s